Christophe André (born 29 May 1987 in La Réunion) is a professional squash player who represented France. He reached a career-high world ranking of World No. 112 in August 2014.

References

External links 
 
 

1987 births
Living people
French male squash players
21st-century French people